Gaahmg may refer to:

 Gaahmg people, or Ingessana people
 Gaam language, or Ingessana, an Eastern Sudanic language spoken by the Ingessana people